Skanes is a surname of Swedish origin. Notable people with the surname include:

Shepherd Skanes, American football coach

Surnames of Swedish origin